The Seth Low was a fireboat built for the Brooklyn Fire Department in Brooklyn, New York, which operated from 1885 to 1917. Prior to her commissioning the Brooklyn Fire Department had relied on fireboats from neighboring municipality New York City. Unlike her opposite number of the New York City Fire Department (FDNY), which had hulls of iron, or steel, the Seth Low was a wooden-hulled vessel.

Her namesake Seth Low was the 23rd mayor of Brooklyn from 1882 to 1885 and later served as the 92nd mayor of New York City from 1902 to 1903.

The Seth Low had a small lounge for her officers in the bows, and a small bunkroom, with four bunks, for off-duty sailors in the stern.

See also
 Fireboats in New York City

References

External links

Fireboats of New York City